Here's Lee Morgan is an album by jazz trumpeter Lee Morgan originally released on the Vee-Jay label.  It was recorded on February 8, 1960 and features performances by Morgan with Clifford Jordan, Wynton Kelly, Paul Chambers and Art Blakey.

Reception
The Allmusic review by Scott Yanow awarded the album 4 stars stating "The music is good solid hard bop that finds Lee Morgan (already a veteran at age 21) coming out of the Clifford Brown tradition to display his own rapidly developing style. Matched with Clifford Jordan on tenor, pianist Wynton Kelly, bassist Paul Chambers and drummer Art Blakey, Morgan's album could pass for a Jazz Messengers set.".

Track listing 
 "Terrible "T"" (Morgan) - 5:17  
 "Mogie" (Morgan) - 7:42  
 "I'm a Fool to Want You" (Herron, Sinatra, Wolf) - 5:36  
 "Running Brook" (Shorter) - 6:03  
 "Off Spring" (Jackson) - 6:13  
 "Bess" (Morgan) - 6:23  
 "Terrible "T"" [Take 7] (Morgan) - 5:42 Bonus track on CD reissue
 "Terrible "T"" [Take 6] (Morgan) - 6:53 Bonus track on CD reissue
 "Mogie" [Take 2] (Morgan) - 7:25 Bonus track on CD reissue
 "Mogie" [Take 1 Mono] (Morgan) - 7:31 Bonus track on CD reissue
 "I'm a Fool to Want You" [Take 1] (Herron, Sinatra, Wolf) - 5:54 Bonus track on CD reissue
 "I'm a Fool to Want You" [Take 2] (Herron, Sinatra, Wolf) - 5:43  
 "Running Brook" [Take 9] (Shorter) - 6:16 Bonus track on CD reissue 
 "Running Brook" [Take 4] (Shorter) - 6:50  Bonus track on CD reissue
 "Off Spring" [Take 7] (Jackson) - 6:39  Bonus track on CD reissue
 "Bess" [Take 3] (Morgan) - 6:38 Bonus track on CD reissue
Recorded at Bell Sound Studio B, NYC, February 8, 1960

Personnel 
 Lee Morgan - trumpet
 Clifford Jordan - tenor saxophone
 Wynton Kelly - piano
 Paul Chambers - bass
 Art Blakey - drums

References 

Hard bop albums
Lee Morgan albums
1960 albums
Vee-Jay Records albums